Airfield rubber removal, also known as runway rubber removal, is the use of high pressure water, abrasives, chemicals and other mechanical means to remove the rubber from tires that builds up on airport runways. In the United States, the Federal Aviation Administration (FAA) specifies friction levels for safe operation of planes and measures friction coefficients for the evaluation of appropriate friction levels. Individual airports incorporate rubber removal into their maintenance schedules based on the number of take offs and landings that each airport experiences.

Source of airfield rubber build-up
When a plane lands, the tires are not spinning. The time it takes for the tires to get up to speed is referred to as "spin up time" (Speidel, 2002). During this time the tires are effectively dragging on the runway as well as being put under pressure by the weight of the airplane. This can be seen in the slight puff of smoke that comes from a landing aircraft's tires as they first touch the runway surface. The friction built up causes the rubber to polymerize and harden to the runway surface.

Effects of rubber buildup
The buildup of rubber affects the level of friction of the runway, most noticeably as a reduction in braking and ground handling performance. This can lead to incidents such as runway overrun or a lateral slide off the runway.
The contributing factors for viscous hydroplaning are a damp or wet pavement,
medium to high speed, poor pavement texture, and worn tire tread. If a runway
has good microtexture and grooving and the aircraft tires have a good tread
design, viscous hydroplaning could be alleviated.(NTSB, p.92)
Macrotexture is visible to the naked eye.  Without the aid of a microscope, microtexture can only be felt. The buildup of rubber directly affects these variables and therefore reduces the friction available for landing which increase the possibility of hydroplaning of the landing airplane.

Methods

High pressure water and ultra high pressure water
Sometimes referred to as hydrocleaning, high pressure and ultra high pressure work on the same principle of applying a spinning jet or set of jets to the surface to break the hardened rubber free from the runway surface. The main difference between the two is the pressure and flow. High pressure and ultra high pressure water operations rely on the impact of water alone, with no other chemicals used. High pressure and ultra high pressure water operations are known for destroying the integrity of the airfield and break down the surface of the runway after multiple uses.

Chemical removal
Cleaning the runway using chemicals involves the application of proprietary cleaners that are brushed into the surface of the runway and then washed off using low pressure water. There is a time between applying the chemicals and washing the runway when the chemicals are allowed to react with and break down the rubber. During this time the runway is unusable for landing operations and therefore could not be used safely in an emergency situation. The chemicals used can be expensive and require special handling. There are currently a newer generation of non-caustic rubber removal chemicals that are also environmentally superior, non-corrosive, non-toxic and relatively inexpensive to use. Some runway maintenance crews like the ability to do their rubber removal in-house using existing or lower cost machinery with a more regular, preventive maintenance program. Chemicals for rubber removal have proven to have no long-term effect on either asphalt or concrete runways. Using equipment to recover waste water/chemical/rubber allows control and safety of disposal with no runoff.

High velocity impact removal
This method employs the principle of throwing abrasive particles at a very high velocity at the runway pavement surface, thus blasting the contaminants from the surface (Speidel, 2002). Also known as sandblasting, this method can introduce foreign object debris to the runway if not contained and cleaned up properly.

Mechanical removal

References

US. Department of Transportation.(1997). Measurement, Construction, and Maintenance of Skid-Resistand Airport Surfaces. Federal Aviation Administration Advisory Circular.
Speidel, Donna J., (2002, February). Airfield Rubber Removal Paper presented at the 2002 Federal Aviation Administration Technology Transfer Conference.
National Transportation Safety Board. 2001. Runway Overrun During Landing, American Airlines Flight 1420, McDonnell Douglas MD-82, N215AA, Little Rock, Arkansas, June 1, 1999. Aircraft Accident Report NTSB-AAR-01-02. Washington, DC.

Airport infrastructure